The following tables are the list of cities in India by population. Often cities are bifurcated into multiple regions (municipalities) which results in creation of cities within cities which may figure in the list. The entire work of this article is based on the 2011 Census of India, conducted by the Office of the Registrar General and Census Commissioner, under Ministry of Home Affairs, Government of India.

Map

List 
The list includes the cities and not urban agglomerations.

Definitions:

The list is based on population within the boundaries of the respective Municipal Corporations and not the actual urban area.

The cities listed in bold are the capitals of the respective state / union territory.

See also 
 List of million-plus urban agglomerations in India
 List of metropolitan areas in India
 List of states and union territories of India by population
 List of towns in India by population

References

External links 
 Indian Census Office of the Registrar General & Census Commissioner, India (archived)

 
Cities by population
Lists of cities in Asia